Ralph Polson (born October 26, 1929) is a former National Basketball Association (NBA) player. Polson was drafted with the fifth pick in the first round of the 1952 NBA draft. On December 11, 1952 Polson was sold from the Knicks to the Philadelphia Warriors. In Polson's one NBA season, he averaged 3.9 points and 4.3 rebounds per game.

References

1929 births
Living people
American Basketball League (1925–1955) players
American men's basketball players
Basketball players from Riverside, California
Centers (basketball)
Manchester British Americans players
New York Knicks draft picks
New York Knicks players
Philadelphia Warriors players
Power forwards (basketball)
Riverside City Tigers men's basketball players
Whitworth Pirates men's basketball players